Sonta is a village located in the municipality of Apatin, West Bačka District, Vojvodina, Serbia. The village has a Croat ethnic majority and its population numbering 4,238 people (2011 census).

Name
According to some sources, inhabitants of Sonta originating from Herzegovina and they came to this village under the leadership of Sonda Vidaković, thus the name of Sonta derived from the name of this person. In Serbian Cyrillic the village is known as Сонта, in Croatian as Sonta, in Hungarian as Szond, and in German as Waldau.

History
It was first mentioned in the 12th century under name Zund. In Ottoman records, Sonta was mentioned as a settlement with 36 families, while in 1898, its population numbered 4,972 inhabitants and 650 houses. During the 1920s, the village was moved 3 km to the north from its original location because of the large floods of the river Danube.

On the session of the Municipality of Apatin in June 2006, Croatian language gain the status of the official language in Sonta. Until then, Serbian language was the sole official language in this village, although Croats comprised majority in the village since the country of Serbia and Montenegro was established.

Culture
Grožđe bal, Annual grape festival

Demographics
Ethnic groups (2002 census)
Croats = 2,966 (59.42%)
Serbs = 975 (19.53%)
Hungarians = 267 (5.35%)
Romanians = 211 (4.23%)
Romani = 138 (2.76%)
others.

Historical population
1961: 6,821
1971: 6,508
1981: 6,313
1991: 5,990
2002: 4,992
2011: 4,238

See also
 List of places in Serbia
 List of cities, towns and villages in Vojvodina

References

 Slobodan Ćurčić, Broj stanovnika Vojvodine, Novi Sad, 1996.

External links 

 History of Sonta  
 Castle Waindl Mor, Sonta

Places in Bačka
West Bačka District
Apatin
Croatian communities